A Scrap of Paper is a 1918 American short comedy film directed by and starring Fatty Arbuckle.

Cast
 Roscoe 'Fatty' Arbuckle - Fatty
 Glen Cavender - The Kaiser
 Al St. John - The Crown Prince
 Monty Banks - Soldier

See also
 Fatty Arbuckle filmography

External links

1918 films
Films directed by Roscoe Arbuckle
1918 comedy films
1918 short films
American silent short films
American black-and-white films
Silent American comedy films
American comedy short films
1910s American films